Chamonixia caespitosa is a species of secotioid fungus in the family Boletaceae. It was described as new to science in 1899 by French mycologist Léon Louis Rolland.

References

External links
 

Boletaceae
Fungi described in 1899
Fungi of Europe
Secotioid fungi